Zovko is a Croatian surname. Notable people with the surname include:

Ivan Zovko (born 1988), Croatian tennis player
Josip Zovko (1970–2019), Croatian actor
Lovro Zovko (born 1981), Croatian tennis player
Marijan Zovko (born 1959), Croatian footballer
Zdravko Zovko (born 1955), Croatian handball player

Surnames
Croatian surnames